Surrogacy is legal in Canada provided that it is altruistic (unpaid). The Assisted Human Reproduction Act of 2004 criminalizes commercial surrogacy. The validity of surrogacy contracts and the process for establishing parenthood of the child is governed by provincial law. Quebec fails to recognize any surrogacy contracts, whereas British Columbia has the most permissive laws governing surrogacy. Provinces also vary in the degree to which they compensate surrogacy expenses, such as IVF procedures.

Between 2001 and 2012, 803 IVF-conceived births were recorded for gestational surrogates in Canada (statistics on traditional surrogacies - in which the surrogate mother is also the egg donor - are not available).

Canada has become a popular site for international surrogacy, in part due to its high-quality universal health care and relatively liberal regulations.

Legal restrictions 

The Assisted Human Reproduction Act of 2004 makes it illegal to pay a surrogate mother, egg donor, or sperm donor. It also outlaws  commercial "intermediaries" from arranging surrogacy services or matching prospective parents and surrogates. It establishes the minimum age for surrogate mothers at 21.

The act allows for intended parents to reimburse a surrogate mother for out-of-pocket expenses incurred in relation to the surrogacy including, for example, maternity clothes, medications, and travel. A surrogate mother may be reimbursed for lost wages if a doctor declares in writing that bed rest is medically necessary. Reimbursements must generally be backed by receipts, and may not result in financial gain for the mother.

As of 2018, there has only been one conviction under the act: a 2014 case in which an Ontario company, Canadian Fertility Consultants, was fined $60,000 for purchasing eggs and paying surrogates.

Quebec 

The Quebec Civil Code renders all surrogacy contracts null. In a 2009 case, a Quebec surrogate gave up her legal claim to her baby, having made an arrangement with a couple. The intended father was recognized as a legal parent because his sperm had been used to conceive the child, but the court denied any legal rights to the intended mother, leaving the child with no legal mother. In four subsequent cases, Quebec courts have allowed intended parents to adopt a child born via surrogate.

International surrogacy 

Canada has become an attractive location for foreign intended parents, who may not be able to legally enter into a surrogacy agreement in their home country. In 2016 and 2017, 45 of 102 babies born to surrogates in British Columbia had intended parents outside of Canada (nation-wide statistics are not collected). While it is illegal under the AHRA for Canadians to pay a surrogate mother, Canadian surrogates may legally accept payment for surrogacy from foreigners, provided that the transaction occurs outside Canada.

Canada is one of the few countries which allows foreign surrogacy, and does not discriminate on the basis of marital status or sexual orientation. Its system of universal health care also relieves intended parents of covering the cost of pregnancy care, birth, and neonatal care.

References

External links 

 Assisted human reproduction - Health Canada

Surrogacy
Family law in Canada